Mícheál Ó Móráin (24 December 1911 – 6 May 1983) was an Irish Fianna Fáil politician who served as Minister for Justice from 1968 to 1970, Minister for the Gaeltacht from 1957 to 1959 and 1961 to 1968 and Minister for Lands from 1959 to 1968. He served as Teachta Dála (TD) from 1938 to 1973.

Ó Móráin was born in Castlebar, County Mayo, hailing from a strong Republican family, members of which had fought in the Irish War of Independence, and in the Irish Civil War on the Anti-Treaty side. A solicitor by profession, Ó Móráin was first elected to Dáil Éireann for the Mayo South constituency on his second attempt at the 1938 general election. He remained on the backbenches for a number of years until he was appointed to the cabinet by Taoiseach Éamon de Valera in 1957 as Minister for the Gaeltacht. He was a native Irish speaker. He was appointed Minister for Lands by Taoiseach Seán Lemass, in 1959 and was re-appointed to the Gaeltacht portfolio in 1961. He remained in these two Departments until 1968.

Ireland formally applied for EEC membership in July 1961. Ó Móráin, as Minister for Lands and the Gaeltacht, delivered a widely reported address to the Castlebar Chamber of Commerce in 1962. In the speech he argued that Ireland was "ready to subscribe to the political aims of the EEC" and that Ireland didn't want to be seen as "committed" to its policy of neutrality. In the ensuing controversy, Ó Móráin and Lemass denied that there was any suggestion Ireland might or should abandon neutrality. Outside the country, foreign governments saw this episode as a deliberately provoked debate in order to evaluate the government’s domestic room for maneuver on neutrality.

Ó Móráin was appointed Minister for Justice by Taoiseach Jack Lynch in 1968. It is in this role that he is most remembered. While Ó Móráin was still Minister, the Arms Crisis in Ireland erupted in 1970. This political scandal saw Government ministers Charles Haughey and Neil Blaney dismissed by the Taoiseach for alleged involvement in a conspiracy to smuggle arms to the Irish Republican Army in Northern Ireland. Ó Móráin continually suffered from ill-health, which was accentuated by his alcoholism. When the Arms Crisis erupted, Lynch came to see Ó Móráin in hospital in Galway and asked for his resignation. Ó Móráin was a witness at the subsequent Arms Trial. He testified that he had passed on Garda intelligence reports about the involvement of ministers with the IRA to the Taoiseach before the arms were seized at Dublin Airport. Ó Móráin's evidence at the trial has been described as "erratic".

Ó Móráin lost his Dáil seat at the 1973 general election and retired from politics. He died in Castlebar, County Mayo, on 6 May 1983.

References

 

1911 births
1983 deaths
Fianna Fáil TDs
Members of the 10th Dáil
Members of the 11th Dáil
Members of the 12th Dáil
Members of the 13th Dáil
Members of the 14th Dáil
Members of the 15th Dáil
Members of the 16th Dáil
Members of the 17th Dáil
Members of the 18th Dáil
Members of the 19th Dáil
Politicians from County Mayo
Irish solicitors
Ministers for Justice (Ireland)
People educated at St Gerald's College, Castlebar
Alumni of University College Dublin